JK Narva Trans, commonly known as Narva Trans or just Trans, are a professional Estonian association football club based in Narva that compete in the Meistriliiga, the top flight of Estonian football. The club's home ground is Narva Kreenholm Stadium.

The club were founded as Avtomobilist in 1979, changed their name to Autobaas in 1989 and Narva Trans in 1992. Narva Trans were one of the founding members of the Meistriliiga and are one of two clubs which have never been relegated from the Estonian top division, along with Flora. Narva Trans have won two Estonian Cups and two Estonian Supercups.

History
The club was founded in 1979 as Avtomobilist by the workers of the Motor Depot 13 in Narva. In 1984, the club was promoted to the Estonian SSR Championship, but was relegated at the end of the season. The club returned to the top division in 1987, but was relegated again after finishing the season last. In 1989, the club changed its name to Autobaas and returned to the top division once again. In 1992, the club changed the name to Narva Trans and became founding members of the new Meistriliiga, finishing the inaugural season in seventh place. Narva Trans finished the 1994–95 season in third place. The club made their European debut in the 1996 UEFA Intertoto Cup. Narva Trans won their first trophy in the 2000–01 Estonian Cup. The club came third in the 2005 season and finished as runners-up in 2006. The team won the Estonian Supercup in 2007 and 2008. Narva Trans finished third for four consecutive seasons in 2008, 2009, 2010 and 2011. The team won their second Estonian Cup trophy in the 2018–19 season, defeating Nõmme Kalju 2–1 in extra time in the final.

Players

Current squad

For season transfers, see transfers summer 2022 and transfers winter 2022–23.

Club officials

Managerial history

Honours
 Estonian Cup
 Winners (2): 2000–01, 2018–19
 Runners-up (5): 1993–94,  2006–07, 2010–11, 2011–12, 2019–20

 Estonian Supercup
 Winners (2): 2007, 2008
 Runners-up (3): 2001, 2012, 2020

Kit manufacturers and shirt sponsors

Seasons and statistics

Seasons

Europe

References

External links

  
 JK Narva Trans at Estonian Football Association
 JK Narva Trans at UEFA.com

 
1979 establishments in Estonia
Association football clubs established in 1979
Narva Trans
Narva Trans
Sport in Narva